Nitrianske Pravno (until 1946 Nemecké Pravno ,  / Deutsch Pranno) is a village and municipality in Prievidza District in the Trenčín Region of western Slovakia.

History
In historical records, the village was first mentioned in 1393. In 1430 it is mentioned as a small town belonging to the Bojnice Castle, with a gold mine nearby. It was prosperous in the 15th century, but as the 16th century came, it slowly began to decay, as the mines were exhausted and with many uprisings taking place at that time. It was degraded in 1886 from town status to large municipality status. The village belonged to a German language island. The German population was expelled in 1945.

Geography
The municipality lies at an altitude of 348 metres (1142 feet) and covers an area of 31.195 km² (12.045 mi²). It has a population of about 3,180 people. The municipality lies in the upper Nitra River valley region, 12 km north of Prievidza.

References

External links
 
 

Villages and municipalities in Prievidza District